Mwaya is an administrative ward in the Kyela district of the Mbeya Region of Tanzania. In 2016, the Tanzania National Bureau of Statistics report there were 12,841 people in the ward, from 11,651 in 2012.

Villages / vitongoji 
The ward has 10 villages and 33 vitongoji.

 Ilondo
 Ikubo
 Ilondo
 Maini
 Kapamisya
 Kabale
 Kapamisya
 Majengo
 Kasala
 Kasala A
 Kasala B
 Kasala C
 Lugombo
 Lubaga
 Lugombo
 Lupando
 Mbaasi
 Mota
 Lukuyu
 Lukuyu
 Mwanjabala
 Malungo
 Malungo
 Mtela
 Serengeti
 Masebe
 Ilembula
 Lugoje
 Masebe Kati
 Mwaya
 Itajania
 Kiputa
 Mwaya
 Njisi
 Ndola
 Ipyasyo
 Lupondo
 Mbegele
 Seko
 Tenende
 Mbasi
 Tenende Chini
 Tenende Juu

References 

Wards of Mbeya Region